The 2006–07 ICC Women's Quadrangular Series was a Women's One Day International cricket tournament that took place in India in February and March 2007. Four teams competed: Australia, England, India and New Zealand. The tournament consisted of a double round-robin group stage, in which Australia and New Zealand finished as the top two, and then a third-place play-off and a final were contested to decide the final positions. Australia defeated New Zealand by 6 wickets in the final. All of the matches took place in Chennai, at the IIT Chemplast Ground and the MA Chidambaram Stadium.

Squads

Tournament format
The four teams competing in the series played each other twice in a double round-robin format, with the top two progressing to the final and bottom two playing off in a third-place play-off. Matches were playing using a One Day International format with 50 overs per side.

The group worked on a points system with positions within the groups being based on the total points. Points were awarded as follows:

Win: 4 points. 
Tie: 2 points. 
Loss: 0 points. 
No Result/Abandoned: 2 points. 
Bonus: 1 point available per match.

If the team batting first won the match and restricted their opponent to 80% of their total, they received a bonus point. If the team batting second won the match in 40 overs, they received a bonus point.

If points in the final table are equal, teams are separated by most wins, then head-to-head record, then number of bonus points, then Net Run Rate.

Points table

Fixtures

Group stage

Third-Place play-off

Final

Statistics

Most runs

Most wickets

References

External links
 Series home at ESPNCricinfo

Women's One Day International cricket competitions
Sports competitions in Chennai
2000s in Chennai
2007 in Indian cricket
International cricket competitions in 2006–07
International women's cricket competitions in India
2006–07 Australian women's cricket season
cricket
2007 in English cricket
cricket
2007 in New Zealand cricket
2007 in women's cricket
2006–07 Indian women's cricket